David Hitz is an American engineer. In 1992, he, James Lau, and Michael Malcolm founded NetApp, where he became an executive vice president.

A graduate of Deep Springs College, Hitz earned a BSE from Princeton University and went on to work as an engineer at MIPS Computer Systems and as a senior engineer at Auspex Systems.

He is co-recipient (with James Lau) of the 2007 IEEE Reynold B. Johnson Information Storage Systems Award.

In February 2019, Hitz announced his retirement as executive vice president of NetApp.

References

External links
 Dave Hitz' blog

American male bloggers
American bloggers
American computer businesspeople
Deep Springs College alumni
Princeton University alumni
Swarthmore College alumni
Living people
Year of birth missing (living people)